André Sylvane, né Paul-Émile-Gérard, born 25 March 1851 at L'Aigle (Orne), was a French dramatist and screenwriter.

Theatre 
1893 : Madame Suzette, operetta by Maurice Ordonneau, André Sylvane and Edmond Audran
1894 : L'Article 214, by André Sylvane et Maurice Ordonneau, théâtre des Variétés in Paris
1901 : Second Ménage, comédy in three acts by Maurice Froyez and André Sylvane
1904 : Tire-au-flanc, play in three acts by André Mouëzy-Éon and André Sylvane, théâtre Déjazet à Paris

Filmography 
1912 : Tire-au-flanc, script by André Mouëzy-Éon and André Sylvane
1928 : Tire-au-flanc by Jean Renoir
1933 : Tire-au-flanc by Henry Wulschleger
1950 : Tire-au-flanc by Fernand Rivers
1961 : The Army Game by Claude de Givray and François Truffaut

External links 
 

19th-century French dramatists and playwrights
French screenwriters
People from Orne
1851 births
Year of death missing